Sasunaga apiciplaga is a moth of the family Noctuidae. It is found in the Northern Territory and Queensland, as well as Maluku in Indonesia.

External links
Australian Faunal Directory
Image at CSIRO Entomology

Hadeninae
Moths of Australia
Moths of Indonesia
Moths described in 1912